Kicking Blood is a 2021 Canadian horror comedy film directed by Blaine Thurier. The film stars Alanna Bale as Anna, a vampire who decides to try to quit her addiction to blood after meeting and falling in love with Robbie (Luke Bilyk), a human recovering alcoholic.

The cast also includes Benjamin Sutherland, Rosemary Dunsmore and Vinessa Antoine.

The film was shot in Sudbury, Ontario in early 2021.

It premiered at the 2021 Toronto International Film Festival on September 10, followed by screenings at the 2021 Cinéfest Sudbury International Film Festival and the 2021 Vancouver International Film Festival.

References

External links
 
 

2021 films
Canadian comedy horror films
Canadian vampire films
English-language Canadian films
Films directed by Blaine Thurier
Films shot in Greater Sudbury
Films about alcoholism
Films about addiction
2020s English-language films
2020s Canadian films